Tinsel Town is a television drama co-produced by BBC Scotland and Raindog/Deep Indigo Productions. It ran for two series, the debuting on BBC Two in 2000 and the second airing on BBC Choice the following year. Developed by Raindog, the series was created by Robbie Allen, Stuart Davids and Martin McCardie. Set throughout the city of Glasgow, Scotland, it deals with the lifestyles of eight main characters who each have the titular Tinsel Town nightclub in common. In Series One, six episodes were written by Martin McCardie, two by Ed McCardie and two by Dublin playwright, Jimmy Murphy. In the second series, the Tinsel Town name has extended to feature a clothing retail store in addition to the nightclub.

Produced and broadcast in the wake of 1999's controversial TV drama Queer as Folk, and promoted as a "Scottish version" of that series, Tinsel Town was defined by its broadcaster as "a cutting-edge saga of life and love in Glasgow club land". In its debut year the series was nominated for four BAFTA Scotland New Talent Awards: Best Television Performance nominations for Dawn Steele and Kate Dickie, and wins for Best Producer, Robbie Allen and Best Television Director for actress turned director Caroline Paterson. The series was also nominated for two UK BAFTAs in the category of Best New Writer. Brothers Ed and Martin McCardie were nominated against each other for the award, with Ed winning UK BAFTA Best New Writer of 2000.

The characters include Stevie Allen as 37-year-old policeman Lewis Reid, and David Paisley as his 17-year-old boyfriend Ryan Taylor. Ryan's sister Sandra (Mandy Matthews) is also a central character with her friendship with Jack Donnelly (Paul Thomas Hickey) providing humour and balance to the cast. Other central cast members were Dawn Steele as Teresa, Steven Duffy as Brady, Stuart Sinclair Blythe as Coutts and Kate Dickie as Lex.

In Series 1, Brady embarks on a sordid affair with Coutts's girlfriend Teresa, resulting in the end of series cliffhanger. New club DJ Lex (Dickie) is introduced at the start of the series and we see her battling to escape her sadistic ex-husband with the help of the club owner, transvestite Stella (Jim Twaddale).

Series Two saw the transmission times reduced to 30 minutes, with all ten episodes being written by co-creator, Martin McCardie. The loss of Brady and Coutts who were central to the plot and cliffhanger of series 1, changed the emphasis of the second series.

The series aired again on BBC Choice in 2001 and then BBC Two in 2002. The first series was released on VHS, but neither has been repeated by the BBC since. Rights to both series were acquired by Rapture TV, who are at least theoretically Scottish-owned, and began airing in May 2006. This is one of the first times that a BBC series has been sold to a free-to-air broadcaster, or been shown FTA other than on the BBC itself.

The shows effective "theme song" is "Out of Control" by the Chemical Brothers and Bernard Sumner, which plays through the majority of in-club sequences as well as other times in the show. However, the actual opening and closing theme is a remix of "Tinseltown in the Rain" by Scottish band The Blue Nile.

Ariel Pink references "a Tinseltown Tranny" in the song "Dedicated to Bobby Jameson".

References

External links
 

Tinsel Town at RaptureTV

2000 British television series debuts
Television shows set in Glasgow
BBC Scotland television shows
2000s British LGBT-related drama television series
2001 British television series endings